Carodista flagitiosa is a moth in the family Lecithoceridae. It was described by Edward Meyrick in 1914. It is found in Malawi.

The wingspan is about 14 mm. The forewings are dark fuscous, faintly purplish tinged. The discal stigmata are faintly indicated as darker spots. The hindwings are dark grey.

References

Moths described in 1914
Carodista